Convictions is an American Christian metalcore band from Ohio. The band was started in 2012. Convictions consists of vocalist Michael Felker and drummer Zachary Schwochow.  The band describes their genre as a style they created called "Aggressive Worship", which is an emotional mix of spirit filled hardcore and ambiance. Shortly after the band formed, they released their first effort I Am Nothing in 2012. With the departure of original vocalist Dan Gardner, the band quickly followed up with their Unworthy EP in late 2013. In 2015, the band released Hallowed Spirit | Violent Divide which charted on #6 in the Top 100 Heavy Metal Albums on iTunes. This led to their signing to Invogue Records and their debut album I Will Become in 2016. The band then released their third LP Hope for the Broken in June 2018.  They released their new album I Won't Survive on May 7, 2021.

Members
Current
 Michael Felker - vocals (2013–present)
 Zach Schwochow - drums (2012–present)
 Jacob Flores - bass (2022-present)
 Patrick Shekut - guitar (2022-present)
 Quinton Dreier - guitar/vocals (2022-present)

Former
 Dan Gardner - vocals (2012)
 Ian Reiter - bass (2012)
 Justin Michael McGough - guitar (2012-2014)
 Joshua Canode - guitar (2012–2022); clean vocals (2022)
 Thomas M Silva - guitar (2014-2016) 
 John Fleischmann - bass/vocals (2013–2018)
 Raymond Roper - bass/vocals (2018-2019)
 Danyal Suchta - bass/vocals (2019–2021)

Timeline

Discography
Studio albums
 I Am Nothing (2012)
 I Will Become (2016)
 Hope for the Broken (2018)

EPs
 Unworthy (2013)
 Hallowed Spirit | Violent Divide (2015)
 I Won’t Survive (2021)

Other Appearances 
 "Memories In The Attic" appears on the compilation Happy Holidays, I Miss You.

References

Musical groups established in 2012
2012 establishments in Ohio